Kasikasima, also spelt Kassikassima, is a mountain in the Sipaliwini District of Suriname.

Kasikasima as well as the Tebutop, the Magneetrots, and the Roseveltpiek were first mapped in 1904 during the Tapanahony expedition.

Kampu 

In the 1990s, a village called Kampu was set up near Mount Kasikasima at the instigation of an evangelist, who had the intention of making the place a bible camp and meeting point of the Tiriyó of Suriname and Brazil. The population as of 2013 is 10 to 20 people.

Notes

References

External links 

 Orange Travel – Kasikasima tour YouTube
 Fabian Vas Experience tour YouTube – Good video from 3:20 on.
 Mets Travel

Inselbergs of South America
Mountains of Suriname
Sipaliwini District